Ruben Cornelis Talberg (born 24 August 1964, in Heidelberg) is an Israeli-German  sculptor. Talberg is known for his Neo-Fluxus Manifolds, which go back to his vision in Bellagio, Italy in the early 1980s. Manifolds are executed either as relief or free-standing sculpture.

Work
Talberg's oeuvre deals with antagonistic positions such as Nature & Alchemy, Asymmetry & Dynamics or Eros & Thanathos. From the beginning of 1990 he intensified his interest for Jewish mysticism and magic. On extensive journeys he collects new impressions that in turn shape the base for new manifolds. Talberg's life-time production is limited to 888 manifolds. His credo: "Finis Coronat Opus Magnum." According to art theory Talberg founded Neo-Fluxus, which is based on his manifesto 1995. The core ideas originate in Heraclitus “pantha rhei - everything flows” and TAO, the philosophy of flow, which also hold true for his Manifolds.

The Talberg Museum was founded in Offenbach am Main. Talberg's manifolds are represented in more than 200 public and private international collections as well as the auction trade. He participated in more than 100 international solo - and group exhibitions.

Talberg lives and works in Heidelberg, Southern France and Israel .

Bibliography

References

External links 
 
 Official R. Talberg website
 artnet.com
 artprice.com

Living people
1964 births
Israeli artists
Contemporary sculptors
German sculptors
Talberg, Ruben
21st-century German Jews
Yiddish-speaking people
Artists from Heidelberg
Mensans